Yvan Reilhac (born 9 June 1995) is a French rugby union player. His position is centre and he currently plays for Montpellier in the Top 14. He can also play as a winger.

Career 
Reilhac made his debut for the senior team on 20 November 2015 in their European Rugby Challenge Cup match against Rugby Calvisano, replacing Anthony Tuitavake for the second half of the match.

References

External links

Rugby union players from Paris
1995 births
Living people
Montpellier Hérault Rugby players
French rugby union players
Rugby union centres